Debates took place among candidates in the campaign for the Democratic Party's nomination for the president of the United States in the 2020 presidential election. Outside of DNC-sponsored debates, candidates are only allowed to attend events in which only one candidate speaks at a time.

Forums

In addition to the party-sponsored debates, many private organizations host forums focusing on select issues and candidates. Candidates do not respond directly to each other at forums.

Forum participation
Ojeda withdrew before the beginning of the forums.

Messam withdrew from the race between the 40th and 41st forum.

Other participants
In a few of the forums, Republicans Bill Weld and Joe Walsh also participated. St. Anselm College's quadrennial "Lesser-Known Candidates Forum" took place on January 28, 2020.

Incidents

Big Ideas Forum stage invasion 
On June 1 during the Big Ideas Forum, a 24-year-old animal rights activist named Aidan Cook stole Sen. Kamala Harris's microphone while she answered a question about equal pay. Security officials and Harris's husband removed Cook from the stage. After the incident, Sen. Cory Booker told CNN he watched the video and was upset with the interference saying, "He crossed a line, this election's going to go on and I'm really hoping that we see Secret Service and others begin to step in because that really could have been a horrifying moment. Kamala's like a sister to me, I love her and that makes me very upset."

2019 Second Step Presidential Justice Forum award
Sponsored by the 20/20 Bipartisan Justice Center, an alliance of Democrat and Republican African Americans seeking criminal justice reform, this presidential candidate forum was scheduled for October 25–27 at Benedict College in Columbia, South Carolina. On its first day, President Trump was presented the Bipartisan Justice award for his part in passing the First Step Act, following which Kamala Harris announced she was pulling out of the forum, which in turn prompted criticism from Trump.  Mayor Steve Benjamin of Columbia (a co-sponsor of the forum) later announced that he had organized an alternative event called the Collegiate Bipartisan Presidential Forum, scheduled October 26–27, 2019, which Harris announced she would attend.

Notes

References

2020 United States presidential debates
2020